The 1894 Tulane Olive and Blue football team represented Tulane University during the 1894 college football season. Led by Fred Sweet in his first and only season as head coach, Tulane compiled a record of 0–4.

Schedule

References

Tulane
Tulane Green Wave football seasons
College football winless seasons
Tulane Olive and Blue football